The Future Combat Air System (FCAS),) is a European combat system of systems under development by Dassault Aviation, Airbus and Indra Sistemas. The FCAS will consist of a Next-Generation Weapon System (NGWS) as well as other air assets in the future operational battlespace. The NGWS's components will be remote carrier vehicles (swarming drones) as well as a New Generation Fighter (NGF) - a sixth-generation jet fighter that by around 2040 will replace current France's Rafales, Germany's Typhoons and Spain's EF-18 Hornets.

A test flight of a demonstrator is expected around 2027 and entry into service around 2040.

Contractors
Dassault will serve as prime contractor for the NGF, while Airbus will lead the development of accompanying remote carrier vehicles and the broader system's supporting combat cloud. It will also be carrier-capable and will fly from the French Navy's future aircraft carrier. Safran Aircraft Engines will be the prime contractor for the next-generation fighter aircraft engine, taking the lead in engine design and integration, while MTU Aero Engines, as the main partner for the first phase of research and technology, will take the lead in engine services.

Each country has designated a national industrial coordinator, Airbus for Germany, Indra for Spain and Dassault for France.

History
The FCAS concept was developed in the frame of the ETAP European Technology Acquisition Programme that was started in 2001 as a co-operation between Germany, France, Great Britain, Italy, Sweden and Spain. The new FCAS concept was a System of Systems (SoS) approach combining manned and unmanned systems, combat aircraft and UCAV, to be more efficient in the envisaged future scenarios than operating with manned systems alone.

In 2017 Germany and Spain asked Airbus to start working on a proposal for a new fighter under the name Future Combat Air System (FCAS).

At the 2018 ILA Berlin Air Show, Dassault Aviation and Airbus announced an agreement to cooperate on the development of the FCAS.

In December 2018, the German Defence Ministry welcomed Spain's expression of interest in the programme.

In June 2019 Spain joined the programme.

In December 2019 Safran and MTU Aero Engines agreed on the foundation of a 50/50 joint venture that will be incorporated by the end of 2021 to manage the development, production, and the after-sales support activities of the new engine to power the NGF.

On 12 February 2020, the first phase (1A) of the research and development program was approved by the German parliament budget committee. It set up the industrial distribution of the first five subprograms.

Development

Initial Demonstrator

Phase 1A - Initial framework contract
Dassault, Airbus, together with their partners MTU Aero Engines, Safran, MBDA and Thales, were awarded the initial framework contract which launches the demonstrator phase. Beginning February 2020 it is expected to cover a period of 18 months of research and development. While it assigned different roles to the above-mentioned companies, Spain was left out:

 Next Generation Fighter (NGF), with Dassault Aviation as prime contractor and Airbus as main partner
 Unmanned systems Remote Carrier (RC) with Airbus as prime contractor and MBDA as main partner
 Combat Cloud (CC) with Airbus as prime contractor and Thales as main partner
 Engine with Safran and MTU Aero Engines as main partner

Phase 1B
Additional suppliers will be involved.

See also
 Global Combat Air Programme
 Next Generation Air Dominance
 F/A-XX program
 Mikoyan PAK DP
 HAL AMCA
 I3 fighter
 KAI KF-21 Boramae
 TAI TF-X
 HAL Combat Air Teaming System

References

External links
 

Proposed aircraft of France
Proposed aircraft of Germany
Proposed military aircraft
French fighter aircraft
New Generation Fighter
New Generation Fighter
Stealth aircraft
Twinjets
Tailless delta-wing aircraft
France defense procurement
Carrier-based aircraft
Spanish fighter aircraft